The Grapes may refer to:

Pubs in the United Kingdom
The Grapes, Eccles, Greater Manchester
The Grapes, Limehouse, London
The Grapes, Sheffield, South Yorkshire
The Grapes, Wandsworth, London

Other uses
The Grapes (band), an American jam and southern rock band
 The Grapes, an Australian band featuring Ashley Naylor and Sherry Rich

See also
Grape
Grapes (disambiguation)
Grapes of Wrath (disambiguation)